Çayırlı is a village and municipality in the Goychay Rayon of Azerbaijan.  The municipality consists of the villages of Çayırlı and Qubadlı Şıxlı.

References

Populated places in Goychay District